Uza (eng. Strength) is a religious moshav in southern Israel. Located in Hevel Lakhish around two kilometres south of Kiryat Gat and covering 1,000 dunams, it falls under the jurisdiction of Shafir Regional Council.

History
The village was established in 1950 by Libyan Jews. Its name was taken from the biblical passage "Summon the might, O God, show the strength, O God, thou who hast wrought for us" (Psalms 68:28)."

References

Moshavim
Religious Israeli communities
Populated places established in 1950
Populated places in Southern District (Israel)
1950 establishments in Israel